Glen Mills station is a railroad station in Glen Mills, Pennsylvania currently used by the West Chester Railroad heritage railway. It is located at 130 Glen Mills Road, and owned by the Thornbury Historical Society.

History 
The site was a stop on the West Chester and Philadelphia Railroad beginning in 1858. The original station was located across the track where the Glen Mills Store now stands. In 1880, the railroad became the Pennsylvania Railroad's West Chester Branch. The current station was built in 1882, and is believed to have been designed by Frank Furness.  It later became a part of SEPTA's West Chester line. SEPTA discontinued regular passenger service in September 1986, due to deteriorating track conditions and Chester County's desire to expand facilities at the nearby Exton station on the Paoli/Thorndale Line.

In 1997, the station was reopened by the West Chester Railroad, a privately owned and operated heritage railway running between Glen Mills and West Chester on weekends. However, due to what their website calls "hazardous and limited parking", the West Chester Railroad does not pick up passengers at Glen Mills. Instead, it serves as a 20-minute layover spot, where passengers can explore the station and picnic grove, and use washrooms.

References

External links
Thornbury Historical Society
West Chester Railroad

Railway stations in the United States opened in 1882
Railway stations closed in 1986
Former SEPTA Regional Rail stations
Former Pennsylvania Railroad stations
Former railway stations in Delaware County, Pennsylvania
Railway stations in Delaware County, Pennsylvania
Railway stations in the United States opened in 1997